WASP-10b is an extrasolar planet discovered in 2008 by SuperWASP using the transit method. It takes about 3 days to orbit around WASP-10. Follow-up radial velocity observations showed that it is three times more massive than Jupiter, while the transit observations showed that its radius is only 8% larger than Jupiter's, giving the planet a density more similar to the Moon than a normal gas giant.
It is currently the only confirmed planet around WASP-10, as WASP-10c is still unconfirmed.

See also
 SuperWASP

References

External links

 
 

Exoplanets discovered by WASP
Exoplanets discovered in 2008
Giant planets
Hot Jupiters
Transiting exoplanets
Pegasus (constellation)